Gergő Zalánki (born 26 February 1995) is a Hungarian water polo player. He was part of the national team of Hungary at the 2016 Summer Olympics.

Honours

Club
Eger 
 Hungarian Championship: 2013–14
 Hungarian Cup: 2015–16
Szolnok 
Hungarian Championship: 2017–18
Hungarian Super Cup: 2017

Ferencváros

LEN Champions League ;runners-up: 2020–21  
 Hungarian Cup: 2019–20, 2020–21
 LEN Super Cup: 2019
Pro Recco
LEN Champions League: 2021–22
 LEN Super Cup: 2021, 2022
Serie A1: 2021–22
Coppa Italia: 2021–22

Awards
2019 World Championship Team of the Tournament
 LEN Champions League Top Scorer  (1): 2021–22 with Pro Recco
Member of the World Team 2022 by total-waterpolo

Personal life
He is married to Fruzsina, and their son, Zénó was born in 2022.

See also
 List of World Aquatics Championships medalists in water polo

References

External links
 

Hungarian male water polo players
Living people
Sportspeople from Eger
1995 births
Water polo players at the 2016 Summer Olympics
World Aquatics Championships medalists in water polo
Universiade medalists in water polo
Universiade gold medalists for Hungary
Water polo players at the 2020 Summer Olympics
Medalists at the 2020 Summer Olympics
Olympic bronze medalists for Hungary in water polo
21st-century Hungarian people